Chalandriani  is a major early Bronze Age cemetery on the island of Syros in Greece, dated to the Early Cycladic II period (Keros-Syros culture, 2600–2300 BC). Chalandriani was first excavated by the Greek classical archaeologist Christos Tsountas in 1898.

Gallery

See also
History of the Cyclades
Cycladic art

References

External links
J.J. Hekman, The early Bronze Age cemetery at Chalandriani on Syros (Cyclades, Greece)

Cycladic civilization
Bronze Age sites in Greece
Archaeological sites on the Aegean Islands
Syros